Post-translational modification (PTM) is the covalent and generally enzymatic modification of proteins following protein biosynthesis. This process occurs in the endoplasmic reticulum and the golgi apparatus. Proteins are synthesized by ribosomes translating mRNA into polypeptide chains, which may then undergo PTM to form the mature protein product. PTMs are important components in cell signaling, as for example when prohormones are converted to hormones.

Post-translational modifications can occur on the amino acid side chains or at the protein's C- or N- termini. They can extend the chemical repertoire of the 22 proteinogenic amino acids by modifying an existing functional group or introducing a new one such as phosphate. Phosphorylation is a highly effective mechanism for regulating the activity of enzymes and is the most common post-translational modification. Many eukaryotic and prokaryotic proteins also have carbohydrate molecules attached to them in a process called glycosylation, which can promote protein folding and improve stability as well as serving regulatory functions. Attachment of lipid molecules, known as lipidation, often targets a protein or part of a protein attached to the cell membrane.

Other forms of post-translational modification consist of cleaving peptide bonds, as in processing a propeptide to a mature form or removing the initiator methionine residue. The formation of disulfide bonds from cysteine residues may also be referred to as a post-translational modification. For instance, the peptide hormone insulin is cut twice after disulfide bonds are formed, and a propeptide is removed from the middle of the chain; the resulting protein consists of two polypeptide chains connected by disulfide bonds.

Some types of post-translational modification are consequences of oxidative stress. Carbonylation is one example that targets the modified protein for degradation and can result in the formation of protein aggregates. Specific amino acid modifications can be used as biomarkers indicating oxidative damage.

Sites that often undergo post-translational modification are those that have a functional group that can serve as a nucleophile in the reaction: the hydroxyl groups of serine, threonine, and tyrosine; the amine forms of lysine, arginine, and histidine; the thiolate anion of cysteine; the carboxylates of aspartate and glutamate; and the N- and C-termini. In addition, although the amide of asparagine is a weak nucleophile, it can serve as an attachment point for glycans. Rarer modifications can occur at oxidized methionines and at some methylene groups in side chains.

Post-translational modification of proteins can be experimentally detected by a variety of techniques, including mass spectrometry, Eastern blotting, and Western blotting. Additional methods are provided in the #External links section.

PTMs involving addition of functional groups

Addition by an enzyme in vivo

Hydrophobic groups for membrane localization
 myristoylation (a type of acylation), attachment of myristate, a C14 saturated acid
 palmitoylation (a type of acylation), attachment of palmitate, a C16 saturated acid
 isoprenylation or prenylation, the addition of an isoprenoid group (e.g. farnesol and geranylgeraniol)
 farnesylation
 geranylgeranylation
 glypiation, glycosylphosphatidylinositol (GPI) anchor formation via an amide bond to C-terminal tail

Cofactors for enhanced enzymatic activity
 lipoylation (a type of acylation), attachment of a lipoate (C8) functional group
 flavin moiety (FMN or FAD) may be covalently attached
 heme C attachment via thioether bonds with cysteines
 phosphopantetheinylation, the addition of a 4'-phosphopantetheinyl moiety from coenzyme A, as in fatty acid, polyketide, non-ribosomal peptide and leucine biosynthesis
 retinylidene Schiff base formation

Modifications of translation factors
 diphthamide formation (on a histidine found in eEF2)
 ethanolamine phosphoglycerol attachment (on glutamate found in eEF1α)
 hypusine formation (on conserved lysine of eIF5A (eukaryotic) and aIF5A (archaeal))
 beta-Lysine addition on a conserved lysine of the elongation factor P (EFP) in most bacteria. EFP is a homolog to eIF5A (eukaryotic) and aIF5A (archaeal) (see above).

Smaller chemical groups
 acylation, e.g. O-acylation (esters), N-acylation (amides), S-acylation (thioesters)
 acetylation, the addition of an acetyl group, either at the N-terminus of the protein or at lysine residues. The reverse is called deacetylation.
 formylation
 alkylation, the addition of an alkyl group, e.g. methyl, ethyl
 methylation the addition of a methyl group, usually at lysine or arginine residues. The reverse is called demethylation.
 amidation at C-terminus. Formed by oxidative dissociation of a C-terminal Gly residue.
 amide bond formation
 amino acid addition
 arginylation, a tRNA-mediation addition
 polyglutamylation, covalent linkage of glutamic acid residues to the N-terminus of tubulin and some other proteins. (See tubulin polyglutamylase)
 polyglycylation, covalent linkage of one to more than 40 glycine residues to the tubulin C-terminal tail
 butyrylation
 gamma-carboxylation dependent on Vitamin K
 glycosylation, the addition of a glycosyl group to either arginine, asparagine, cysteine, hydroxylysine, serine, threonine, tyrosine, or tryptophan  resulting in a glycoprotein. Distinct from glycation, which is regarded as a nonenzymatic attachment of sugars.
 O-GlcNAc, addition of N-acetylglucosamine to serine or threonine residues in a β-glycosidic linkage
 polysialylation, addition of polysialic acid, PSA, to NCAM
 malonylation
 hydroxylation: addition of an oxygen atom to the side-chain of a Pro or Lys residue
 iodination: addition of an iodine atom to the aromatic ring of a tyrosine residue (e.g. in thyroglobulin)
 nucleotide addition such as ADP-ribosylation
 phosphate ester (O-linked) or phosphoramidate (N-linked) formation
 phosphorylation, the addition of a phosphate group, usually to serine, threonine, and tyrosine (O-linked), or histidine (N-linked)
 adenylylation, the addition of an adenylyl moiety, usually to tyrosine (O-linked), or histidine and lysine (N-linked)
 uridylylation, the addition of an uridylyl-group (i.e. uridine monophosphate, UMP), usually to tyrosine
 propionylation
 pyroglutamate formation
 S-glutathionylation
 S-nitrosylation
 S-sulfenylation (aka S-sulphenylation), reversible covalent addition of one oxygen atom to the thiol group of a cysteine residue

 S-sulfinylation, normally irreversible covalent addition of two oxygen atoms to the thiol group of a cysteine residue
 S-sulfonylation, normally irreversible covalent addition of three oxygen atoms to the thiol group of a cysteine residue, resulting in the formation of a cysteic acid residue
 succinylation addition of a succinyl group to lysine
 sulfation, the addition of a sulfate group to a tyrosine.

Non-enzymatic additions in vivo
 glycation, the addition of a sugar molecule to a protein without the controlling action of an enzyme.
 carbamylation the addition of Isocyanic acid to a protein's N-terminus or the side-chain of Lys.
 carbonylation the addition of carbon monoxide to other organic/inorganic compounds.
 spontaneous isopeptide bond formation, as found in many surface proteins of Gram-positive bacteria.

Non-enzymatic additions in vitro
 biotinylation: covalent attachment of a biotin moiety using a biotinylation reagent, typically for the purpose of labeling a protein.
 carbamylation: the addition of Isocyanic acid to a protein's N-terminus or the side-chain of Lys or Cys residues, typically resulting from exposure to urea solutions.
 oxidation: addition of one or more Oxygen atoms to a susceptible side-chain, principally of Met, Trp, His or Cys residues. Formation of disulfide bonds between Cys residues.
 pegylation: covalent attachment of polyethylene glycol (PEG) using a pegylation reagent, typically to the N-terminus or the side-chains of Lys residues. Pegylation is used to improve the efficacy of protein pharmaceuticals.

Conjugation with other proteins or peptides
 ubiquitination, the covalent linkage to the protein ubiquitin.
 SUMOylation, the covalent linkage to the SUMO protein (Small Ubiquitin-related MOdifier)
 neddylation, the covalent linkage to the Nedd protein
 ISGylation, the covalent linkage to the ISG15 protein (Interferon-Stimulated Gene 15)
 pupylation, the covalent linkage to the prokaryotic ubiquitin-like protein

Chemical modification of amino acids 
 citrullination, or deimination, the conversion of arginine to citrulline
 deamidation, the conversion of glutamine to glutamic acid or asparagine to aspartic acid
 eliminylation, the conversion to an alkene by beta-elimination of phosphothreonine and phosphoserine, or dehydration of threonine and serine

Structural changes 
 disulfide bridges, the covalent linkage of two cysteine amino acids
 proteolytic cleavage, cleavage of a protein at a peptide bond
 isoaspartate formation, via the cyclisation of asparagine or aspartic acid amino-acid residues
 racemization
 of serine by protein-serine epimerase
 of alanine in dermorphin, a frog opioid peptide
 of methionine in deltorphin, also a frog opioid peptide
 protein splicing, self-catalytic removal of inteins analogous to mRNA processing

Statistics

Common PTMs by frequency
In 2011, statistics of each post-translational modification experimentally and putatively detected have been compiled using proteome-wide information from the Swiss-Prot database. The 10 most common experimentally found modifications were as follows:

Common PTMs by residue 
Some common post-translational modifications to specific amino-acid residues are shown below. Modifications occur on the side-chain unless indicated otherwise.

Databases and tools 

Protein sequences contain sequence motifs that are recognized by modifying enzymes, and which can be documented or predicted in PTM databases. With the large number of different modifications being discovered, there is a need to document this sort of information in databases. PTM information can be collected through experimental means or predicted from high-quality, manually curated data. Numerous databases have been created, often with a focus on certain taxonomic groups (e.g. human proteins) or other features.

List of resources 
 PhosphoSitePlus – A database of comprehensive information and tools for the study of mammalian protein post-translational modification
 ProteomeScout – A database of proteins and post-translational modifications experimentally
 Human Protein Reference Database – A database for different modifications and understand different proteins, their class, and function/process related to disease causing proteins
 PROSITE – A database of Consensus patterns for many types of PTM's including sites
 RESID  – A database consisting of a collection of annotations and structures for PTMs.
 iPTMnet – A database that integrates PTM information from several knowledgbases and text mining results.  
 dbPTM – A database that shows different PTM's and information regarding their chemical components/structures and a frequency for amino acid modified site
 Uniprot has PTM information although that may be less comprehensive than in more specialized databases.
 The O-GlcNAc Database - A curated database for protein O-GlcNAcylation and referencing more than 14 000 protein entries and 10 000 O-GlcNAc sites.

Tools 
List of software for visualization of proteins and their PTMs
 PyMOL – introduce a set of common PTM's into protein models
 AWESOME – Interactive tool to see the role of single nucleotide polymorphisms to PTM's
 Chimera – Interactive Database to visualize molecules

Case examples 

 Cleavage and formation of disulfide bridges during the production of insulin
 PTM of histones as regulation of transcription: RNA polymerase control by chromatin structure
 PTM of RNA polymerase II as regulation of transcription
 Cleavage of polypeptide chains as crucial for lectin specificity

See also
 Protein targeting
 Post-translational regulation

References

External links
 dbPTM - database of protein post-translational modifications
(Wayback Machine copy)
 List of posttranslational modifications in ExPASy
 Browse SCOP domains by PTM — from the dcGO database
 Statistics of each post-translational modification from the Swiss-Prot database
(Wayback Machine copy)
 AutoMotif Server - A Computational Protocol for Identification of Post-Translational Modifications in Protein Sequences
 Functional analyses for site-specific phosphorylation of a target protein in cells
 Detection of Post-Translational Modifications after high-accuracy MSMS
 Overview and description of commonly used post-translational modification detection techniques

Gene expression
Protein structure
Protein biosynthesis
 
Cell biology